"Man on the Edge" is a single from the Iron Maiden album The X Factor released in 1995. The song is based on the film Falling Down, starring Michael Douglas. It was the first single the band released with Blaze Bayley on vocals.

Synopsis
In addition to an interview with Bayley and another track from The X Factor, the single features three originals that did not make the album's final cut. It is one of two Blaze Bayley era songs to make it onto the Edward the Great compilation, along with "Futureal", as well as one of three to make it onto Best of the Beast along with "Sign of the Cross" and "Virus".

Iron Maiden frequently played this song during the Ed Hunter tour in 1999, making it one of 5 Bayley era songs to survive in concerts after his departure (The others being "Lord of the Flies", "Sign of the Cross", "Futureal", and "The Clansman").

A live version of this song from 1999 is featured on the 2000 single release of "The Wicker Man" and on the compilation From Fear to Eternity from 2011, with Bruce Dickinson on vocals.

There were three videos made for this song. One is filmed on location at Masada, Israel, the second is a more cinematic video of the band performing as a man throws himself off a building, and the third is a 'sneak-peek' promo video consisting only of clips of pratfalls from black and white silent movies was used for promotional purposes prior to release. This third version appears as an 'Easter Egg' on the Visions of the Beast DVD.

The song was featured in the video game Carmageddon 2.

On the cover of CD 1 Eddie's brain has been cut in half, though on CD 2 he still has his brain attached. The 12" Picture Disc was the same as CD 1 though because it moved within the sleeve it could look very different, very much like an "X" in the right position.

Track listing
CD single 1

CD single 2

12" picture disc

Personnel
Production credits are adapted from the CD, and picture disc covers.
Iron Maiden
Blaze Bayley – lead vocals
Dave Murray – guitar
Janick Gers – guitar
Steve Harris – bass guitar, producer, mixing
Nicko McBrain – drums
Production
Nigel Green – producer, mixing
Ronal Whelan – mastering

Charts

Cover versions
 Middle Island, NY metal band Iron Rainbow recorded a cover of Man on the Edge that was featured on the 1998 Metal Injection (A Lethal Dose of Heavy Metal Mayhem) compilation album.

References

External links
 Music video on YouTube.

Iron Maiden songs
1995 singles
Songs written by Blaze Bayley
Songs written by Janick Gers
Number-one singles in Finland